Hemidactylus hegdei is a species of gecko. It is endemic to India.

References

Hemidactylus
Reptiles described in 2022
Reptiles of India
Endemic fauna of India